Collen Makgopela (born 26 October 1985 in Brits) is a South African football midfielder for Premier Soccer League club Platinum Stars and his previous club was Arcadia Shepherds.

References

1985 births
Living people
South African soccer players
Association football forwards
Platinum Stars F.C. players